In mathematics, a symmetric space is a Riemannian manifold (or more generally, a pseudo-Riemannian manifold) whose group of symmetries contains an inversion symmetry about every point. This can be studied with the tools of Riemannian geometry, leading to consequences in the theory of holonomy; or algebraically through Lie theory, which allowed Cartan to give a complete classification. Symmetric spaces commonly occur in differential geometry, representation theory and harmonic analysis.

In geometric terms, a complete, simply connected Riemannian manifold is a symmetric space if and only if its curvature tensor is invariant under parallel transport. More generally, a Riemannian manifold (M, g) is said to be symmetric if and only if, for each point p of M, there exists an isometry of M fixing p and acting on the tangent space  as minus the identity (every symmetric space is complete, since any geodesic can be extended indefinitely via symmetries about the endpoints). Both descriptions can also naturally be extended to the setting of pseudo-Riemannian manifolds.

From the point of view of Lie theory, a symmetric space is the quotient G/H of a connected Lie group G by a Lie subgroup H  which is (a connected component of) the invariant group of an involution of G. This definition includes more than the Riemannian definition, and reduces to it when H is compact.

Riemannian symmetric spaces arise in a wide variety of situations in both mathematics and physics. Their central role in the theory of holonomy was discovered by Marcel Berger. They are important objects of study in representation theory and harmonic analysis as well as in differential geometry.

Geometric definition
Let M be a connected Riemannian manifold and p a point of M. A diffeomorphism f of a neighborhood of p is said to be a geodesic symmetry if it fixes the point p and reverses geodesics through that point, i.e. if γ is a geodesic with  then  It follows that the derivative of the map f at p is minus the identity map on the  tangent space of p. On a general Riemannian manifold, f need not be isometric, nor can it be extended, in general, from a neighbourhood of p to all of M.

M is said to be locally Riemannian symmetric if its geodesic symmetries are in fact isometric. This is equivalent to the vanishing of the covariant derivative of the curvature tensor. 
A locally symmetric space is said to be a (globally) symmetric space if in addition its geodesic symmetries can be extended to isometries on all of M.

Basic properties
The Cartan–Ambrose–Hicks theorem implies that M is locally Riemannian symmetric if and only if its curvature tensor is covariantly constant, and furthermore that every simply connected, complete locally Riemannian symmetric space is actually Riemannian symmetric.

Every Riemannian symmetric space M is complete and Riemannian homogeneous (meaning that the isometry group of M acts transitively on M). In fact, already the identity component of the isometry group acts transitively on M (because M is connected).
 
Locally Riemannian symmetric spaces that are not Riemannian symmetric may be constructed as quotients of Riemannian symmetric spaces by discrete groups of isometries with no fixed points, and as open subsets of (locally) Riemannian symmetric spaces.

Examples
Basic examples of Riemannian symmetric spaces are Euclidean space, spheres, projective spaces, and hyperbolic spaces, each with their standard Riemannian metrics. More examples are provided by compact, semi-simple Lie groups equipped with a bi-invariant Riemannian metric.

Every compact Riemann surface of genus greater than 1 (with its usual metric of constant curvature −1) is a locally symmetric space but not a symmetric space.

The lens spaces are quotients of the 3-sphere by a discrete isometry that has no fixed points.

An example of a non-Riemannian symmetric space is anti-de Sitter space.

Algebraic definition
Let G be a connected Lie group. Then a symmetric space for G is a homogeneous space G/H where the stabilizer H of a typical point is an open subgroup of the fixed point set of an involution σ in Aut(G). Thus σ is an automorphism of G with σ2 = idG and H is an open subgroup of the invariant set

 
Because H is open, it is a union of components of Gσ (including, of course, the identity component).

As an automorphism of G, σ fixes the identity element, and hence, by differentiating at the identity, it induces an automorphism of the Lie algebra  of G, also denoted by σ, whose square is the identity. It follows that the eigenvalues of σ are ±1. The +1 eigenspace is the Lie algebra  of H (since this is the Lie algebra of Gσ), and the −1 eigenspace will be denoted .

with

Thus any symmetric space is a reductive homogeneous space, but there are many reductive homogeneous spaces which are not symmetric spaces. The key feature of symmetric spaces is the third condition that  brackets into .

Riemannian symmetric spaces satisfy  the Lie-theoretic characterization
If M is a Riemannian symmetric space, the identity component G of the isometry group of M is a Lie group acting transitively on M (that is, M is Riemannian homogeneous). Therefore, if we fix some point p of M, M is diffeomorphic to the quotient G/K, where K denotes the isotropy group of the action of G on M at p. By differentiating the action at p we obtain an isometric action of K on TpM. This action is faithful (e.g., by a theorem of Kostant, any isometry in the identity component is determined by its 1-jet at any point) and so K is a subgroup of the orthogonal group of TpM, hence compact. Moreover, if we denote by sp: M → M the geodesic symmetry of M at p, the map

is an involutive Lie group automorphism such that the isotropy group K is contained between the fixed point group  and its identity component (hence an open subgroup)  see the definition and following proposition on page 209, chapter IV, section 3 in Helgason's Differential Geometry, Lie Groups, and Symmetric Spaces for further information.

To summarize, M is a symmetric space G/K with a compact isotropy group K. Conversely, symmetric spaces with compact isotropy group are Riemannian symmetric spaces, although not necessarily in a unique way. To obtain a Riemannian symmetric space structure we need to fix a K-invariant inner product on the tangent space to G/K at the identity coset eK: such an inner product always exists by averaging, since K is compact, and by acting with G, we obtain a G-invariant Riemannian metric g on G/K.

To show that G/K is Riemannian symmetric, consider any point p = hK (a coset of K, where h ∈ G) and define

where σ is the involution of G fixing K. Then one can check that sp is an isometry with (clearly) sp(p) = p and (by differentiating) dsp  equal to minus the identity on TpM. Thus sp is a geodesic symmetry and, since p was arbitrary, M is a Riemannian symmetric space.

If one starts with a Riemannian symmetric space M, and then performs these two constructions in sequence, then the Riemannian symmetric space yielded is isometric to the original one. This shows that the "algebraic data" (G,K,σ,g) completely describe the structure of M.

Classification of Riemannian symmetric spaces

The algebraic description of Riemannian symmetric spaces enabled Élie Cartan to obtain a complete classification of them in 1926.

For a given Riemannian symmetric space M let (G,K,σ,g) be the algebraic data associated to it. To classify the possible isometry classes of M, first note that the universal cover of a Riemannian symmetric space is again Riemannian symmetric, and the covering map is described by dividing the connected isometry group G of the covering by a subgroup of its center. Therefore, we may suppose without loss of generality that M is simply connected. (This implies K is connected by the long exact sequence of a fibration, because G is connected by assumption.)

Classification scheme
A simply connected Riemannian symmetric space is said to be irreducible if it is not the product of two or more Riemannian symmetric spaces. It can then be shown that any simply connected Riemannian symmetric space is a Riemannian product of irreducible ones. Therefore, we may further restrict ourselves to classifying the irreducible, simply connected Riemannian symmetric spaces.

The next step is to show that any irreducible, simply connected Riemannian symmetric space M is of one of the following three types:

1. Euclidean type: M has vanishing curvature, and is therefore isometric to a Euclidean space.

2. Compact type: M has nonnegative (but not identically zero) sectional curvature.

3. Non-compact type: M has nonpositive (but not identically zero) sectional curvature.

A more refined invariant is the rank, which is the maximum dimension of a subspace of the tangent space (to any point) on which the curvature is identically zero. The rank is always at least one, with equality if the sectional curvature is positive or negative.  If the curvature is positive, the space is of compact type, and if negative, it is of  noncompact type.  The spaces of Euclidean type have rank equal to their dimension and are isometric to a Euclidean space of that dimension. Therefore, it remains to classify the irreducible, simply connected Riemannian symmetric spaces of compact and non-compact type. In both cases there are two classes.

A. G is a (real) simple Lie group;

B. G is either the product of a compact simple Lie group with itself (compact type), or a complexification of such a Lie group (non-compact type).

The examples in class B are completely described by the classification of simple Lie groups. For compact type, M is a compact simply connected simple Lie group, G is M×M and K is the diagonal subgroup. For non-compact type, G is a simply connected complex simple Lie group and K is its maximal compact subgroup. In both cases, the rank is the rank of G.

The examples of class A are completely described by the classification of noncompact simply connected real simple Lie groups. For non-compact type, G is such a group and K is its maximal compact subgroup. Each such example has a corresponding example of compact type, by considering a maximal compact subgroup of the complexification of G which contains K. More directly, the examples of compact type are classified by involutive automorphisms of compact simply connected simple Lie groups G (up to conjugation). Such involutions extend to involutions of the complexification of G, and these in turn classify non-compact real forms of G.

In both class A and class B there is thus a correspondence between symmetric spaces of compact type and non-compact type. This is known as duality for Riemannian symmetric spaces.

Classification result
Specializing to the Riemannian symmetric spaces of class A and compact type, Cartan found that there are the following seven infinite series and twelve exceptional Riemannian symmetric spaces G/K. They are here given in terms of G and K, together with a geometric interpretation, if readily available. The labelling of these spaces is the one given by Cartan.

As Grassmannians
A more modern classification  uniformly classifies the Riemannian symmetric spaces, both compact and non-compact, via a Freudenthal magic square construction.

General symmetric spaces

An important class of symmetric spaces generalizing the Riemannian symmetric spaces are pseudo-Riemannian symmetric spaces, in which the Riemannian metric is replaced by a pseudo-Riemannian metric (nondegenerate instead of positive definite on each tangent space). In particular, Lorentzian symmetric spaces, i.e., n dimensional pseudo-Riemannian symmetric spaces of signature (n − 1,1), are important in general relativity, the most notable examples being Minkowski space, De Sitter space and anti-de Sitter space (with zero, positive and negative curvature respectively). De Sitter space of dimension n may be identified with the 1-sheeted hyperboloid in a Minkowski space of dimension n + 1.

Symmetric and locally symmetric spaces in general can be regarded as affine symmetric spaces. If M = G/H is a symmetric space, then Nomizu showed that there is a G-invariant torsion-free affine connection (i.e. an affine connection whose torsion tensor vanishes) on M whose curvature is parallel. Conversely a manifold with such a connection is locally symmetric (i.e., its universal cover is a symmetric space). Such manifolds can also be described as those affine manifolds whose geodesic symmetries are all globally defined affine diffeomorphisms, generalizing the Riemannian and pseudo-Riemannian case.

Classification results
The classification of Riemannian symmetric spaces does not extend readily to the general case for the simple reason that there is no general splitting of a symmetric space into a product of irreducibles. Here a symmetric space G/H with Lie algebra

Since   is not semisimple (or even reductive) in general, it can have indecomposable representations which are not irreducible.

However, the irreducible symmetric spaces can be classified. This is the analogue of the Riemannian dichotomy between Euclidean spaces and those of compact or noncompact type, and it motivated M. Berger to classify semisimple symmetric spaces (i.e., those with    semisimple) and determine which of these are irreducible. The latter question is more subtle than in the Riemannian case: even if  is simple, G/H might not be irreducible.

As in the Riemannian case there are semisimple symmetric spaces with G = H × H. Any semisimple symmetric space is a product of symmetric spaces of this form with symmetric spaces such that  is simple. It remains to describe the latter case. For this, one needs to classify involutions σ of a (real) simple Lie algebra . If  is not simple, then  is a complex simple Lie algebra, and the corresponding symmetric spaces have the form G/H, where H is a real form of G: these are the analogues of the Riemannian symmetric spaces G/K with G a complex simple Lie group, and K a maximal compact subgroup.

Thus we may assume  is simple.

The classification therefore reduces to the classification of commuting pairs of antilinear involutions of a complex Lie algebra. The composite σ∘τ determines a complex symmetric space, while τ determines a real form. From this it is easy to construct tables of symmetric spaces for any given , and furthermore, there is an obvious duality given by exchanging σ and τ. This extends the compact/non-compact duality from the Riemannian case, where either σ or τ is a Cartan involution, i.e., its fixed point set is a maximal compact subalgebra.

Tables
The following table indexes the real symmetric spaces by complex symmetric spaces and real forms, for each classical and exceptional complex simple Lie group.

For exceptional simple Lie groups, the Riemannian case is included explicitly below, by allowing σ to be the identity involution (indicated by a dash). In the above tables this is implicitly covered by the case kl=0.

Weakly symmetric Riemannian spaces

In the 1950s Atle Selberg extended Cartan's definition of symmetric space to that of weakly symmetric Riemannian space, or in current terminology weakly symmetric space. These are defined as Riemannian manifolds M  with a transitive connected Lie group of isometries G and an isometry σ normalising G such that given x, y in M there is an isometry s in G such that sx =   σy and sy = σx. (Selberg's assumption that σ2 should be an element of G was later shown to be unnecessary by Ernest Vinberg.) Selberg proved that weakly symmetric spaces give rise to Gelfand pairs, so that in particular the unitary representation of G on L2(M) is multiplicity free.

Selberg's definition can also be phrased equivalently in terms of a generalization of geodesic symmetry. It is required that for every point x in M and tangent vector X at x, there is an isometry s of M, depending on x and X, such that

s fixes x;
the derivative of s at x sends X to –X.

When s is independent of X, M is a symmetric space. 
 

Properties
Some properties and forms of symmetric spaces can be noted.

Lifting the metric tensor
This is done by defining

The minus sign appears because the Killing form is negative-definite on  this makes  positive-definite.

Factorization
The tangent space  can be further factored into eigenspaces classified by the Killing form. This is accomplished by defining an adjoint map  taking  as

This map is sometimes called the generalized transpose, as corresponds to the transpose for the orthogonal groups and the Hermitian conjugate for the unitary groups.

These are orthogonal with respect to the metric, in that

since the Killing form is symmetric.  This factorizes  into eigenspaces

with

For the case of  semisimple, so that the Killing form is non-degenerate, the metric likewise factorizes:

In certain practical applications, this factorization can be interpreted as the spectrum of operators, e.g. the spectrum of the hydrogen atom, with the eigenvalues of the Killing form corresponding to different values of the angular momentum of an orbital (i.e. the Killing form being a Casimir operator that can classify the different representations under which different orbitals transform.)

Classification of symmetric spaces proceeds based on whether or not the Killing form is positive/negative definite.

Applications and special cases

Symmetric spaces and holonomy

If the identity component of the holonomy group of a Riemannian manifold at a point acts irreducibly on the tangent space, then either the manifold is a locally Riemannian symmetric space, or it is in one of 7 families.

Hermitian symmetric spaces

A Riemannian symmetric space which is additionally equipped with a parallel complex structure compatible with the Riemannian metric is called a Hermitian symmetric space. Some examples are complex vector spaces and complex projective spaces, both with their usual Riemannian metric, and the complex unit balls with suitable metrics so that they become complete and Riemannian symmetric.

An irreducible symmetric space G/K is Hermitian if and only if K contains a central circle. A quarter turn by this circle acts as multiplication by i on the tangent space at the identity coset. Thus the Hermitian symmetric spaces are easily read off of the classification. In both the compact and the non-compact cases it turns out that there are four infinite series, namely AIII, BDI with p=2, DIII and CI, and two exceptional spaces, namely EIII and EVII. The non-compact Hermitian symmetric spaces can be realized as bounded symmetric domains in complex vector spaces.

Quaternion-Kähler symmetric spaces

A Riemannian symmetric space which is additionally equipped with a parallel subbundle of End(TM) isomorphic to the imaginary quaternions at each point, and compatible with the Riemannian metric, is called quaternion-Kähler symmetric space.

An irreducible symmetric space G/K is quaternion-Kähler if and only if isotropy representation of K contains an Sp(1) summand acting like the unit quaternions on a quaternionic vector space. Thus the quaternion-Kähler symmetric spaces are easily read off from the classification. In both the compact and the non-compact cases it turns out that there is exactly one for each complex simple Lie group, namely AI with p = 2 or q = 2 (these are isomorphic),  BDI with p = 4 or q = 4, CII with p = 1 or q = 1, EII, EVI, EIX, FI and G.

Bott periodicity theorem

In the Bott periodicity theorem, the loop spaces of the stable orthogonal group can be interpreted as reductive symmetric spaces.

See also
Orthogonal symmetric Lie algebra
Relative root system
Satake diagram
Cartan involution

References

  Contains a compact introduction and many tables.
 
 
 
 
 The standard book on Riemannian symmetric spaces.

 
  Chapter XI contains a good introduction to Riemannian symmetric spaces.
 
 

 

Differential geometry
Riemannian geometry
Lie groups
Homogeneous spaces